Fanta Keita (8 May 1981 - 30 October 2006) was a Senegalese judoka. She was an African champion in 2005, and a Senegal champion twice, in 2000 and 2005.

Keita died following a training accident.

References

1981 births
2006 deaths
Senegalese female judoka